Al Ras is a rapid transit station on the Green Line of the Dubai Metro in Dubai, UAE.

History
Al Ras metro station opened as part of the first portion of the Green Line on 9 September 2011, with trains running from Etisalat to Dubai Healthcare City.

Location
Al Ras station is located in the eponymous Al Ras community in Deira near the entrance to Dubai Creek, in the historic centre of Dubai. Among the major points of interest near the station are the Gold Souk, the Spice Souk, Al Ras Public Library, and the Sheikh Saeed Al Maktoum House.

Station layout

Like most Dubai Metro stations in the city's historic centre, Al Ras lies underground, specifically below Baniyas Road and 103rd Street. Al Ras has two side platforms with two tracks, with tracks curving from underneath Dubai Creek northeasterly towards Palm Deira. Along with its sister station across Dubai Creek to the west, Al Ghubaiba, Al Ras has different theming than most Metro stations. Instead of using the elements of air, water, fire or earth, its design is inspired by traditional Middle Eastern architecture to mirror the surrounding architecture.

Platform layout

References

External links
 

Railway stations in the United Arab Emirates opened in 2011
Dubai Metro stations